Arles Antonio Castro Laverde (born July 17, 1979) is a male professional track and road racing cyclist from Colombia. He won a silver medal for his native country at the 2007 Pan American Games in Rio de Janeiro, Brazil alongside Carlos Alzate, Jairo Pérez and Juan Pablo Forero in the Men's Track Team Pursuit. He competed at the 2008 Summer Olympics in Beijing, PR China and the 2012 Summer Olympics in London.

Career

2001
2nd in UCI World Cup, Track, Team Pursuit, Cali, (COL)
2003
2nd in  National Championship, Track, Pursuit, Duitama (COL)
 : in Pan American Games, Track, Team Pursuit, Santo Domingo (DOM)
2005
1st in Stage 2 Vuelta a El Salvador, Chalatenangno (ESA)

2007
  in Pan American Championships, Track, Points Race, Valencia (VEN)
  in Pan American Championships, Track, Team Pursuit, Valencia (VEN)

  in Pan American Games, Track, Team Pursuit, Rio de Janeiro (BRA)

2008
3rd in UCI World Cup, Track, Individual Pursuit, Cali, (COL)
3rd in UCI World Cup, Track, Team Pursuit, Cali, (COL)
2010
2nd in UCI World Cup, Track, Team Pursuit, Cali, (COL)
2011
 in Pan American Games, Track, Team Pursuit, Guadalajara (MEX)
 
2012
1st in UCI World Cup, Track, Team Pursuit, Cali (COL)
2013
 in Bolivarian Games, Track, Team Pursuit, Trujillo (PER)

References
 
 

1979 births
Living people
Colombian male cyclists
Colombian track cyclists
Cyclists at the 2003 Pan American Games
Cyclists at the 2007 Pan American Games
Cyclists at the 2011 Pan American Games
Cyclists at the 2015 Pan American Games
Olympic cyclists of Colombia
Cyclists at the 2008 Summer Olympics
Cyclists at the 2012 Summer Olympics
Sportspeople from Antioquia Department
Pan American Games gold medalists for Colombia
Pan American Games silver medalists for Colombia
Pan American Games medalists in cycling
Central American and Caribbean Games gold medalists for Colombia
South American Games gold medalists for Colombia
South American Games medalists in cycling
Competitors at the 2010 South American Games
Competitors at the 2006 Central American and Caribbean Games
Central American and Caribbean Games medalists in cycling
Medalists at the 2003 Pan American Games
Medalists at the 2007 Pan American Games
Medalists at the 2015 Pan American Games
Medalists at the 2011 Pan American Games
20th-century Colombian people
21st-century Colombian people
Competitors at the 2010 Central American and Caribbean Games